Dunnville Secondary School is a public high school in Dunnville, Ontario, Canada, part of the Grand Erie District School Board. The school accommodates students from Haldimand County between the ages of 14 and 21. , the school had 562 students.

See also
List of high schools in Ontario

References

External links

High schools in Haldimand County
Educational institutions in Canada with year of establishment missing